WBZE (98.9 FM, "Star 98.9") is an adult contemporary radio station in the Tallahassee, Florida, market owned by Cumulus Licensing, LLC. Its studios are located on the west side of Tallahassee and its transmitter is based due north of downtown along I-10.  According to AllAccess.com, WBZE is the third-highest-rated station in the market, following only sister stations WHBX and WWLD.

History
The station signed on the air on July 15, 1962. The station has been an adult contemporary formatted station since 1983. Prior to its adult contemporary launch in 1983, the station previously had a Top 40 format.

External links

BZE
Radio stations established in 1962
1962 establishments in Florida
Cumulus Media radio stations